Jocelyne Dawn Marie Larocque (born May 19, 1988) is a Canadian ice hockey player and current independent member of the PWHPA. She previously played with the Calgary Inferno and Markham Thunder of the Canadian Women's Hockey League (CWHL), the Calgary Oval X-Treme and Manitoba Maple Leafs of the Western Women's Hockey League (WWHL), and the Minnesota-Duluth Bulldogs of the Western Collegiate Hockey Association (WCHA). With the Bulldogs, she was a two-time NCAA Women's Ice Hockey Tournament champion (2008, 2010). Larocque is of Métis heritage and was the first indigenous athlete to participate in the women's ice hockey tournament at the Winter Olympics.

Playing career
Larocque played hockey and basketball from 2002 to 2004 at College Lorette Collegiate in Manitoba. During the 2003–04 season, she became the first female player to appear in the Winnipeg High School Boys League. Larocque attended the Hockey Manitoba Program of Excellence Camp from June 25 to 27, 2004. Larocque competed for Manitoba at the 2003 Esso Women's Nationals in Saskatoon as the Manitoba team finished eighth. In January 2005, she was a member of the Manitoba team that participated in the Canadian National Women's Under-18 Championship in Salmon Arm, BC. Manitoba finished fifth, but Larocque was honoured as Top Defenceman. She won the WWHL championship with the Calgary Oval X-Treme in 2005.

NCAA hockey
In March 2008, Larocque had one assist as UMD won their fourth NCAA national championship in a 4–0 win over the University of Wisconsin. She competed along with two other players from her hometown of Ste. Anne, Manitoba (population 1,500), Minnesota Golden Gophers senior captain Melanie Gagnon and Mercyhurst forward Bailey Bram. The three were known colloquially as the “Ste. Anne Three.” Also in 2009, Larocque was the first Bulldog defenceman to be named to the All-American first team.

After being cut from Team Canada's Olympic roster in December 2009, Larocque elected to return to UMD for the second half of the 2009–10 season, forfeiting half a season of NCAA eligibility. On March 22, 2010, Larocque and the Bulldogs earned their fifth NCAA national championship with a 3–2 triple overtime victory over Cornell University.

In a February 12, 2011 game against the Ohio State Buckeyes, Larocque had a goal and three assists as the Bulldogs defeated Ohio State by a 5–1 mark. Already the all-time top-scoring defenceman in UMD history, she became UMD's 14th player and first defenceman to score 100 career points. Larocque's assist on a power play goal with 40 seconds remaining was her second career four-point game. Larocque was the top-scoring defenceman in the WCHA for the 2010–11 season, with six goals and 18 assists for 24 points in 26 league contests.

In post-season league honours, Larocque was named to the All-WCHA first team; was voted the WCHA Defensive Player of the Year in a vote of the league's head coaches; was the top-scoring defenceman in the league with six goals, 18 assists and 24 points in 26 league contests; was named the WCHA Outstanding Student Athlete of the Year; and was named to the 2010–11 All-WCHA Academic Team.

She graduated with honors from the University of Minnesota Duluth in 2011 with a Bachelor of Accountancy. She ended her college hockey career as the Bulldogs' all-time leader in scoring for defencemen with 105 points on 19 goals and 86 assists in 127 games.

Hockey Canada
She participated in the Canadian National Team Fall Festival from August 31 to September 9, 2007. She was an Air Canada Cup women's champion in 2005–06 and 2006–07. On November 27, 2009, Larocque and Brianne Jenner were released from Hockey Canada's centralized roster to determine the roster for the Vancouver 2010 Winter Games.

Despite not qualifying for the roster competing at the 2010 Winter Olympics in Vancouver, she was named to the final roster for the 2010 MLP Nations Cup. Larocque had an assist in the semi-final of the 2010 MLP Cup. In addition, she attended the Hockey Canada Strength and Conditioning Camp in Calgary from May 25 to 30, 2010. In addition, Larocque competed with Canada at the 2010 Four Nations Cup and won a gold medal.

Her Olympic debut with the national team came at the 2014 Sochi Olympics, where Team Canada won the gold medal. She played in the 2018 Winter Olympics in Pyeongchang, South Korea, winning a silver medal with Team Canada. She received attention following the gold medal game for removing her silver medal immediately after it was presented to her, prompting a later reproach from an IIHF official. She issued an apology the following day, saying in part, "In the moment, I was disappointed with the outcome of the game, and my emotions got the better of me. I meant no disrespect. It has been an honour to represent my country and win a medal for Canada. I'm proud of our team and proud to be counted among the Canadian athletes who have won medals at these games."

On January 11, 2022, Larocque was named to Canada's 2022 Olympic team.

CWHL
Larocque first played for the Team Alberta franchise and remained with them after a rebranding that saw them renamed the Calgary Inferno. In August 2013, she was traded to the Brampton Thunder for fellow Manitoban Bailey Bram. Of note, she served as the final team captain in the history of the Brampton Thunder. When the franchise relocated to Markham, Ontario, she continued as team captain. Of note, she served in the capacity when the Thunder captured the 2018 Clarkson Cup, a franchise first.

Personal life
Former Gophers player and captain Melanie Gagnon is Larocque's cousin. A team was named after her at the 2007 Female Atom Hockey Festival presented by the Manitoba Moose on December 29, at the MTS Centre in Winnipeg.

Larocque's sister, Chantal, has competed for Canada at the ISBHF World Championships. Both were also teammates on the now-defunct Calgary Oval X-Treme.

Career statistics
Career statistics are from USCHO.com, or Eliteprospects.com, or The Internet Hockey Database, or NCAA or the Team Canada Media Guide for 2022.

Regular season and playoffs

International

Awards and honours

NCAA
2009 First Team All-America selection
WCHA Defensive Player of the Week (Week of February 16, 2011)
2011 Patty Kazmaier Award Nominee
2011 WCHA Outstanding Student-Athlete of the Year
2011 WCHA Defensive Player of the Year
2011 All-WCHA First Team
2011 First Team All-America selection

International
2014 Sochi Olympic Women's Hockey Gold Medal
2018 Pyeongchang Olympics Women's Silver Medal
2022 Beijing Olympics Women's Gold Medal

CWHL
2018 Clarkson Cup champion

Other
2018 winner of the Tom Longboat Award
Manitoba Indigenous Female Athlete of the Decade (awarded January 2021)

References

External links
 
 
 
 
 

1988 births
Brampton Thunder players
Calgary Inferno players
Calgary Oval X-Treme players
Canadian expatriate ice hockey players in the United States
Canadian women's ice hockey defencemen
Clarkson Cup champions
First Nations sportspeople
Ice hockey people from Manitoba
Ice hockey players at the 2014 Winter Olympics
Ice hockey players at the 2018 Winter Olympics
Ice hockey players at the 2022 Winter Olympics
Living people
Markham Thunder players
Medalists at the 2014 Winter Olympics
Medalists at the 2018 Winter Olympics
Medalists at the 2022 Winter Olympics
Métis sportspeople
Minnesota Duluth Bulldogs women's ice hockey players
Olympic gold medalists for Canada
Olympic ice hockey players of Canada
Olympic medalists in ice hockey
Olympic silver medalists for Canada
People from Ste. Anne, Manitoba
Professional Women's Hockey Players Association players
First Nations sportswomen